The Watchmen are a Canadian rock band. They were one of the most commercially successful bands in Canada in the mid to late 1990s. During their peak years, the band had one platinum record (In the Trees) and three more gold records (McLaren Furnace Room, Silent Radar, and Slomotion). The band has toured Canada a number of times, were the opening act for The Tragically Hip, and co-headlined a national tour with Big Wreck.

History
The Watchmen first came together in Winnipeg, Manitoba in 1988. Founding members were Daniel Greaves, Joey Serlin, Sammy Kohn and Pete Loewen.  After performing together for several years, they released an album, McLaren Furnace Room, in 1992.

In 1994, Loewen left the band and was replaced by Ken Tizzard. That same year, the band released their second album, In the Trees. The album was certified Platinum in Canada and is the band's most successful album to date.

The band released the albums Brand New Day and Silent Radar in 1996 and 1998, respectively.

In 1999 the band performed as part of Humble & Fred Fest at Fort York in Toronto. Kohn had left the band when they recorded their 2001 album Slomotion; the percussion tracks were created electronically.  A single from the album, "Absolutely Anytime" was in the Top Ten on the Canadian charts for several weeks.  While touring to support the album, the band took on drummer Ryan Ahoff.

In 2003, the Watchmen announced their farewell tour and their intention to disband. They returned to Winnipeg to perform at a fundraiser for the Israel national bobsleigh team.

In 2010, the Watchmen came together for a reunion show at the Horseshoe Tavern in Toronto. They have since continued to perform occasional shows across Canada.

The Watchmen are members of the Canadian charity Artists Against Racism.

Discography

Studio albums

Live albums
Live Radar (1998)
Last Road Trip Download Series (2004)
Live and in Stereo (2017)

Singles

References

External links

[ AllMusic Guide page]
 

Musical groups established in 1988
Musical groups disestablished in 2003
Musical groups reestablished in 2008
Musical groups from Winnipeg
Canadian alternative rock groups
1988 establishments in Manitoba
2003 disestablishments in Manitoba
2008 establishments in Manitoba